The Keiser School is a historic school building at Main and School Streets in Keiser, Arkansas.  It is a two-story brick and concrete structure with a rough T shape.  The horizontal of the T houses classrooms and offices, while the extension to the rear houses the auditorium and gymnasium.  The building has restrained Collegiate Gothic style, with a raised castellated parapet, and a pointed archway over the main entrance.  It was built in 1929, and is a fine local example of the architectural style.

The building was listed on the National Register of Historic Places in 1992.

See also
National Register of Historic Places listings in Mississippi County, Arkansas

References

School buildings on the National Register of Historic Places in Arkansas
Collegiate Gothic architecture in Arkansas
School buildings completed in 1929
National Register of Historic Places in Mississippi County, Arkansas
1929 establishments in Arkansas
Schools in Mississippi County, Arkansas